Akhalkatsi is a Georgian surname. Notable people with the surname include:

 Roman Akhalkatsi (born 1980), Georgian footballer
 Nodar Akhalkatsi (1938–1998), Georgian footballer and coach

Georgian-language surnames